The Indochinese Trade & Development Corporation (IndochinaTrader) was a multinational corporation located in Ho Chi Minh City, Vietnam.  The company was founded in October 2012 and now had operations in 7 countries worldwide.

The Indochinese Trade & Development Corporation LLC was a Vietnamese domiciled limited liability company, which was first given permission to trade & development activities in late 2012. Its previous activities included trade facilitation and economic development.

IndochinaTrader exported Vietnamese organic foods, including coconut candy worldwide, and provided advisory services to the Vietnamese and Cambodian governments on international trade and economic development.  From 2012 to 2014, IndochinaTrader worked with The AgriBio Corporation to develop an all-natural treatment for land affected by Agent Orange during the Vietnam War.

References

External links
 The Indochinese Trade & Development Corporation

Vietnamese brands
Food and drink companies of Vietnam
Vietnamese companies established in 2012
Companies based in Ho Chi Minh City